The Hollywood Walk of Fame awards notable people in the film, television, music, radio and theatre industries. However, stars have also been awarded to fictional characters. The following is a list of fictional characters with stars on the Hollywood Walk of Fame, including the category and location of each honoree.

Fictional characters
The following fictional characters have received stars on the Hollywood Walk of Fame; 14 in motion pictures and 5 in television.

Actors with their character name inscribed below them

Live-action animals
Three live-action canines have stars on the Walk.

Corporate entities
Several corporate entities are on the Walk.  All are nominated in the "Special Recognition Category", and as with Tom Bradley and Johnny Grant, many have special logos other than the five normal categories.

See also
List of stars on the Hollywood Walk of Fame

References 

Hollywood Walk of Fame
Hollywood Walk of Fame